Messara may refer to:

Messara Plain, an illuvial plain in southern Crete
Messara horse, an animal breed

See also
Mesarea, historical region of Greece
Mesaria (disambiguation)